
Gmina Rypin is a rural gmina (administrative district) in Rypin County, Kuyavian-Pomeranian Voivodeship, in north-central Poland. Its seat is the town of Rypin, although the town is not part of the territory of the gmina.

Villages
Gmina Rypin contains the villages and settlements of Balin, Borzymin, Cetki, Czyżewo, Dębiany, Dylewo, Głowińsk, Godziszewy, Iwany, Jasin, Kowalki, Kwiatkowo, Ławy, Linne, Marianki, Nowe Sadłowo, Podole, Puszcza Miejska, Puszcza Rządowa, Rakowo, Rusinowo, Rypałki Prywatne, Sadłowo, Sadłowo-Rumunki, Sikory, Starorypin, Starorypin Prywatny, Starorypin Rządowy, Stawiska, Stępowo and Zakrocz.

Neighbouring gminas
Gmina Rypin is bordered by the town of Rypin and by the gminas of Brzuze, Osiek, Rogowo, Skrwilno, Świedziebnia and Wąpielsk.

References
Polish official population figures 2006

Rypin
Rypin County